Billy Hedderman is an Irish Army officer who has served in the Irish Defence Forces and is a serving captain in the Australian Defence Force. Hedderman served for 13 years in the Irish Army, including 3 years as a platoon commander within the elite Army Ranger Wing special operations force, having passed ARW Selection as a young officer. His overseas deployments with the Irish Army included Chad and Bosnia. He moved to an Australian Army infantry unit as a captain in a "lateral transfer" process in 2014. On New Year's Eve 2014 Hedderman suffered a surfing accident in which he broke his neck, back and suffered immediate spinal cord damage, which paralysed him from the neck down. He documented his road to recovering from paralysis in the book Unbowed: A Soldier's Journey Back from Paralysis.

References

Military personnel from County Cork
Living people
Year of birth missing (living people)
People from County Cork